Alfonso Ramírez Cuéllar (born 14 June 1959) is a Mexican politician affiliated with the National Regeneration Movement. He served as a federal deputy of the LVII Legislature of the Mexican Congress representing Zacatecas and the LIX and LXIV Legislature representing Mexico City.

References

1959 births
Living people
Politicians from Zacatecas
Deputies of the LXIV Legislature of Mexico
Party of the Democratic Revolution politicians
20th-century Mexican politicians
Deputies of the LVII Legislature of Mexico
Deputies of the LIX Legislature of Mexico
Members of the Chamber of Deputies (Mexico) for Zacatecas
Members of the Chamber of Deputies (Mexico) for Mexico City